Vladimir Yakovlevich Shainsky (12 December 1925 – 25 December 2017) was a Soviet and Russian composer. He was a recipient of the People's Artist of the RSFSR (1986).

Biography
Shainsky was born in Kiev to a Jewish family. He first studied violin at the music school in Kiev. His studies there were interrupted in 1941 by World War II, when his family was evacuated to Tashkent, Uzbek SSR. He continued his musical education at the Tashkent Conservatory, until he was enlisted in the Red Army. After the war he entered Moscow Conservatory, where he graduated as a violinist. In the 1950s Shainsky played in Leonid Utyosov's orchestra, taught students, and worked as a music manager at various dance orchestras. He later studied composition in Baku conservatory. His first compositional works were a string quartet, created in 1963 during his studies in Baku conservatory, and a symphony, written in 1965.

During his career as a composer, Shainsky wrote a great number of works for children. He created music and songs for cartoons such as Cheburashka, Katerok, Mamontenok and Kroshka Enot; also for films, including Breakfast on the Grass, Aniskin and Fantomas, Aniskin Again, School Waltz, Finist, the brave Falcon; and for musicals. He wrote many songs, such as A Soldier is Walking in the Town, Russia's Little Corner, White Birch, Smile, Clouds, A Dog is Lost, Crocodile Gena's Song, True thrushes Shainsky has also authored numerous songs in the Yiddish language, still popular with the klezmer orchestras. Shainsky has been awarded numerous awards, including the USSR State Prize (1981), People's Artist of the RSFSR (1986) of the Russian SFSR title (1986), Order of Friendship (1996). He is a multiple prizewinner of the Russian (formerly Soviet) Song of the Year festival (since 1971) and was a member of the political party United Russia.

Shainskay was married three times: 1) to composer Asya Sultanova; 2) to Natalya Vasilievna Shainskaya, with whom he had a son; and 3) to Svetlana Vladimirovna Shainskaya, with whom he had a son and a daughter.

Shainsky was ill with stomach cancer and underwent several operations. He died at 2 am on Christmas Day 2017, at the age of 92, after suffering a long illness at the San Diego Hospital in California, United States.

References

External links

Shainskiy's biography 
Another biography 
Author of soundtrack for top-rated Soviet cartoon miniseries dies at age of 92 
 Владимир Яковлевич Шаинский на Animator.ru

1925 births
2017 deaths
20th-century classical composers
20th-century Russian male musicians
Musicians from Kyiv
Baku Academy of Music alumni
Moscow Conservatory alumni
Male film score composers
Composers for piano
People's Artists of the RSFSR
Recipients of the Decoration of Honor Meritorious for Polish Culture
Recipients of the Lenin Komsomol Prize
Recipients of the Order "For Merit to the Fatherland", 4th class
Recipients of the Order of Honour (Russia)
Recipients of the USSR State Prize
Jewish classical composers
Jewish songwriters
Russian emigrants to Israel
Russian film score composers
Russian Jews
Russian male classical composers
Russian songwriters
Russian people of Ukrainian-Jewish descent
Soviet film score composers
Soviet Jews
Soviet male classical composers
Soviet songwriters
Ukrainian Jews
Israeli emigrants to the United States
Deaths from bladder cancer
Deaths from cancer in California
Burials in Troyekurovskoye Cemetery
Soviet military personnel of World War II from Ukraine